Dadeldhura, a part of Sudurpashchim Province, is one of the seventy-seven districts of Nepal.

The region has a mountainous landscape that contains many religious temples. The district is seldom visited by tourists but contains local routes to Mt Kailash in Tibet, Ra Ra Lake in Humla district, and the last remaining remnants of the Far Western Malla Kingdom. Nagi Malla was the last royal to live here before the Nepalese unification. 

The spoken language is Doteli and the majority of inhabitants are Hindu. Dadeldhura is the most developed district among the other hilly districts in the far western region. Dadeldhura is the hometown of current prime minister of Nepal Hon. Sher Bahadur Deuba.

Geography and climate

Demographics
At the time of the 2011 Nepal census, Dadeldhura District had a population of 142,094. Of these, 92.6% spoke Doteli, 5.4% Nepali, 1.1% Magar, 0.2% Kham, 0.2% Raute, 0.1% Maithili and 0.1% other languages as their first language.

In terms of ethnicity/caste, 53.6% were Chhetri, 15.8% Hill Brahmin, 10.6% Kami, 4.5% Sarki, 3.8% Damai/Dholi, 3.6% Magar, 2.5% Thakuri, 1.8% Sanyasi/Dasnami, 1.6% Lohar, 0.9% Newar, 0.2% Badi, 0.2% other Dalit, 0.2% Raute, 0.2% Yadav, 0.1% Gurung, 0.1% Tharu, and 0.2% others.

In terms of religion, 98.9% were Hindu, 0.7% Buddhist and 0.3% Christian.

In terms of literacy, 65.0% could read and write, 2.6% could only read and 32.3% could neither read nor write.

Administration
The district consists of seven municipalities, out of which two are urban municipalities and five are rural municipalities. These are as follows:
 Amargadhi municipality
 Parshuram municipality
 Aalitaal Rural Municipality
 Bhageshwar Rural Municipality
 Navadurga Rural Municipality
 Ajaymeru Rural Municipality
 Ganyapadhura Rural Municipality

Former village development committees 
Prior to the restructuring of the district, Dadeldhura District consisted of the following Village development committees:

Ajayameru
Alital
Amargadhi
Ashigram
Bagarkot
Belapur
Bhadrapur
Bhageshwar
Bhumiraj
Chipur
Dewal Dibyapur
Ghatal
Ganeshpur
Gankhet
Jogbuda
Kailapalmandau
Khalanga
Koteli
Manilek
Mashtamandau
Nawadurga
Rupal
Sahastralinga
Samaiji
Sirsha

See also
Pasela

References

 
 Districts of Nepal established during Rana regime or before